Asmara is the most populous city in the country of Eritrea.

Asmara may also refer to:

Places
University of Asmara, a public university in the city
Asmara College of Health Sciences, a public college in the city
Asmara International Airport, an airport serving the Asmara metropolitan area

Films
Asmara Moerni, an Indonesian romance film
Asmara Songsang, a Malaysian anti-LGBT film
Asmara (TV series), an Indonesian soap opera

Other
Asmara Brewery, an Eritrean brewery
Asmara Brewery FC, a football club operated by the brewery above